John Wesley Hunt (1773–1849) was a prominent businessman and early civic leader in Lexington, Kentucky. He was one of the first millionaires west of the Allegheny Mountains. Hunt enslaved as many as 77 people, many of them children, including farm and industrial and domestic workers.

John Wesley Hunt was born in 1773 in Trenton, New Jersey. He was the son of a Lt. Col. in the Revolutionary War, Abraham Hunt, and Theodosia Pearson Hunt. Moving to Lexington in 1795, he became a merchant, slavetrader, horsebreeder, hemp manufacturer, and banker. In 1799, President John Adams named Hunt as postmaster of Lexington.

A horsebreeder, he introduced the Messenger strain to Kentucky in the winter of 1839-1840.

He married Catherine Grosh, and in 1814, he built a two-story brick mansion known as "Hopemont" (today known as The Hunt-Morgan House) for him and his wife.  Their son Charlton Hunt became the first mayor of Lexington.

He died in 1849. He was buried in the family plot at the Lexington Cemetery. His grandson, John Hunt Morgan, was a famous Confederate general during the American Civil War of 1861-1865. Through John Hunt Morgan, he was also the great-great grandfather of African-American inventor Garrett Morgan. A great-grandson, Dr. Thomas Hunt Morgan, was the first Kentuckian to win a Nobel Prize.

References

Ramage, James A., John Wesley Hunt, Pioneer Merchant, Manufacturer, & Financier, Lexington, Kentucky, University Press of Kentucky, 1974. .

External links
 Digitized images of the Hunt-Morgan House deposit photographs, 1847-1966 housed at the University of Kentucky Libraries Special Collections Research Center
 Digitized images of the Abijah and John Wesley Hunt daybook, 1796 July 2 - October 1, housed at the University of Kentucky Libraries Special Collections Research Center
 Guide to Hunt-Morgan family papers, 1784-1949 housed at the University of Kentucky Libraries Special Collections Research Center

1773 births
1849 deaths
Businesspeople from Lexington, Kentucky
American racehorse owners and breeders